Jochem Tanghe (born 9 May 1987) is a Belgian football goalkeeper who currently plays for Hoogstraten VV. .

Career 
He made his début in the Jupiler League with Lierse SK in a 0-1 win over Charleroi SC. Tanghe was only 4th keeper at that time, but played due to the Zheyun Ye case and injuries. He left in July 2008 Royal Antwerp FC and signed for K. Londerzeel S.K.
In 2009-2010 he plays for Hoogstraten VV.

External links
Guardian's Stats Centre

1987 births
Living people
Belgian footballers
Association football goalkeepers
Lierse S.K. players
Royal Antwerp F.C. players
Hoogstraten VV players